Mohd Azhar bin Jamaluddin is a Malaysian politician from UMNO. He was the Member of Perak State Legislative Assembly for Changkat Jong from 2013 to 2022.

Politics 
He is the Chairman of UMNO Teluk Intan Branch and the Chairman of Teluk Intan Community College Advisor Committee.

Election result

Honours 
  :
  Medal of the Order of the Defender of the Realm (PPN) (2007)
  :
  Knight Commander of the Order of the Perak State Crown (DPMP) – Dato’ (2014)

References 

Medallists of the Order of the Defender of the Realm
United Malays National Organisation politicians
Members of the Perak State Legislative Assembly
Malaysian people of Malay descent
Living people
Year of birth missing (living people)